The El Peral funicular is located between two urban centers of Valparaíso, Chile, Plaza de la Justicia (Justice Square), a quiet place in Valparaiso’s downtown and Paseo Yugoslavo (Yugoslav Walk) that offers a sightseeing balcony with a vista of the bay and mountains.

Access turnstiles are in an alley inside a building, Augusto Geiger’s work. The upper station reaches Paseo Yugoslavo. Here is a view of the city and the Museo Municipal de Bellas Artes de Valparaíso  (Fine Arts Museum). The top station allows visitors to see the propulsion machinery. This funicular was the first that used steam traction equipment, and its chimney became the main feature. When first opened, El Peral was the most advanced funicular due to its structural aspect and for the surrounding complementary buildings.

See also 
 Funicular railways of Valparaíso

References 

Funicular railways in Chile
Buildings and structures in Valparaíso
Buildings and structures completed in 1902